An award is a formal recognition.

Award also may refer to:

Honorable distinctions
 Industrial award, a distinction in Australian labour law
 Medal, an object struck to be given as an award (for example, the Medal of Honor) 
 Order (distinction), a distinction awarded by a sovereign state, monarch, dynastic royal house, or organization to a recipient, typically in recognition of individual merit
 Prize, a reward given to a person or group to recognize and reward actions or achievements (for example, a Nobel Prize or Pulitzer Prize)

Legal
 Child custody award
 Civil-court award, a payout to the victor, also known as damages

See also 
 Award Software
 Lists of awards

ru:Прайс (немецкая фамилия)